Tetramethylphosphonium bromide is an organophosphorus compound with the formula (CH3)4PBr. It is a white, water-soluble solid, the salt of the cation tetramethylphosphonium and the bromide anion.  It is prepared by treating trimethylphosphine with methyl bromide.

Reactions

Deprotonation gives methylenetrimethylphosphine ylide, which can sustain a second deprotonation:
(CH3)4PBr  +  BuLi →  CH3)3P=CH2  +  LiBr  +  BuH
CH3)3P=CH2  +  BuLi →  CH3)2P(CH2)2Li  +  BuH
The latter is a precursor to many coordination complexes, e.g., the dicuprous complex Cu2[(Me2P(CH2)2]2.

References

Quaternary phosphonium compounds
Bromides